HaBayit HaLeumi (The National Home) is an organization based in Israel dedicated to stopping former Prime Minister Ariel Sharon's disengagement plan. The organization was behind civil disobedience protesting the disengagement plan of Sharon. 

On Monday, May 16, 2005, a nonviolent protest was held throughout the country, with the protesters blocking major traffic arteries throughout Israel. The protest was sponsored by HaBayit HaLeumi, and was hailed by them as a success, with over 400 protesters arrested, half of them juveniles. Over 40 intersections throughout the country were blocked, including:
The entrance to Jerusalem
Bar Ilan/Shmuel Hanavi junction in Jerusalem
Sultan's Pool junction outside the Old City of Jerusalem
Geha Highway
Golumb St. corner of Begin Blvd. in Jerusalem

The organization draws upon the experience of Moshe Feiglin and Zo Artzeinu, the organization that led mass protests against the 1992 Oslo Accords.

References

Conflicts in 2005
Israeli disengagement from Gaza
Civil disobedience
Political organizations based in Israel